Lab Quarters, also DRDO Township and Kanchanbagh, is a colony in Old City, Hyderabad, Telangana, to accommodate the employees working in the Defence Laboratories of DRDO. It is well connected with the city, the Midhani depot being just adjacent to it. Lab Quarters is one of the largest colonies in Hyderabad, comparable to those of Bharat Heavy Electricals Limited and Kukatpally Housing Board.

It is a very green area and isolated from the mundane traffic and pollution of the rest of the city. It is close to Santosh Nagar colony and babanagar area. Some popular healthcare centres like the Central Government Health Scheme Dispensary, Owaisi Hospital and the Apollo DRDO hospitals are located nearby. The main commercial places are the shopping complex, community hall, parks, mess (general and for officers). Lab Quarters has excellent educational institutions like the Defence Laboratories school and the Kendriya Vidyalaya Kanchanbagh. While the former is a private venture, the latter is managed by the all-India Kendriya Vidyalaya Sangathan and financed by the DRDO Laboratories around it. It has got a temple inside the Township.

It also has several grounds, the largest of which is the one at the Kendriya Vidyalaya.

The township contains one helipad which becomes functional when receiving VIPs like the President, Prime Minister and other important dignitaries.

This township was once the residential address for late president and India's premier missile man Dr. A.P.J. Abdul Kalam. He was serving as the director of Defence Research and Development Laboratory, which has since been renamed in his memory.

Recently introduced sports complex in the township's houses are a swimming pool, badminton courts, and a table tennis conclave.

Neighbourhoods in Hyderabad, India